Sandalwood is a town and locality in the Australian state of South Australia located about  east of the state capital of Adelaide.

Sandalwood lies between Karoonda and Alawoona on the Karoonda Highway and Loxton railway line. It was founded as a siding on the new railway line, which opened in 1913. The post office opened in 1914, and the school in 1919. These have now all closed.

The 2016 Australian census which was conducted in August 2016 reports that Sandalwood had a population of 60 people.

Sandalwood is located in the local government area of District Council of Karoonda East Murray, the state electoral district of Hammond and the federal Division of Barker.

References

Towns in South Australia